Omony is a surname. Notable people with the surname include: 

Postnet Omony (born 1982), Ugandan footballer
Stephen Omony (born 1981), Ugandan basketball player
Sunday Omony, Ugandan-Canadian plus-size model and activist

Surnames of African origin